Luis Rodrigo Santelices Tello (born 29 October 1985) is a Chilean professional footballer who plays as a goalkeeper for Primera División de Chile side Everton.

Honours
Curicó Unido
 Primera B: 2008

External links
 
 

1985 births
Living people
Chilean footballers
Association football goalkeepers
Primera B de Chile players
Chilean Primera División players
Curicó Unido footballers
Deportes Linares footballers
C.D. Antofagasta footballers
People from Curicó